The 2002 Tel Aviv outdoor mall bombing was a terrorist attack which occurred on 25 January 2002 in which a Palestinian suicide bomber blew himself up in Tel Aviv, Israel, injuring at least 24 civilians.

After the attack, the Islamist Palestinian militant organization Islamic Jihad claimed responsibility for the attack.

Background 
The week before the attack, IDF forces assassinated four senior members of the Izz ad-Din al-Qassam Brigades during a raid of their hideout in Nablus.

On 24 January 2002, an Israeli helicopter assassinated Bakr Hamdan in the Gaza Strip, the leader of the Izz ad-Din al-Qassam Brigades, which Israeli security official said was responsible for "dozens of terrorist attacks carried out against Israeli civilians and soldiers in the Gaza Strip."

The attack
On 25 January 2002, at 11:15 A.M., a Palestinian suicide bomber carrying hidden explosives attached to his body which were filled with shrapnel, blew himself up in a crowded pedestrian mall adjacent to the old abandoned bus station in Tel Aviv.

At least 24 people were injured in the attack, three of them critically wounded, four were moderately wounded and the rest were lightly wounded.

Perpetrators
Islamic Jihad took responsibility for the attack in a statement given to the Lebanese TV station Al-Manar. In this statement, they said that the suicide bomber was 17-year-old Safwat Abdurrahman Khalil, a resident of the Palestinian town Beit Wazan near Nablus.

Immediately after the attack, Israeli police forces at the site of the attack found an abandoned AK-47 rifle and caught the suicide bomber's partner, who was allegedly supposed to use the rifle in order to increase the number of casualties in the attack. The suicide bomber's partner, who was from Nablus, was reportedly carrying a Koran in which the date and place of the attack were written.

Reactions
Involved parties
:
 Senior Israeli officials stated that Israeli sees the Palestinian leadership and Palestinian leader Yasser Arafat as responsible for the attack, whom they said are doing nothing to prevent the attacks.

:
 The Palestinian Authority issued a statement in which it condemned "any act that harms Israeli civilians".

Response
In response to the bombing, at nightfall an Israeli F-16 attacked the Palestinian security headquarters in Gaza located near Yasser Arafat's compound. In addition, the F-16 fired two missiles at national security and intelligence buildings in Tulkarm. According to Palestinian medical officials, two Palestinian were injured in the Tulkarm attack.

In March 2002, the Israeli Arab Nasser Fahemi, a resident of Tira at the time, was tried at the HaShalom court in Kfar Saba for enabling the perpetrators of the 2002 Tel Aviv outdoor mall bombing to stay at his home until a vehicle reached his house and transported them to the site of the attack, and for providing them advice on how not to get caught. Fahemi admitted the charges and was sentenced to three years in prison and one year probation.

See also
 List of terrorist incidents, 2002

References

External links 
 Suicide Bomb Wounds 2 Dozen in Tel Aviv Outdoor Mall - published on nytimes.com on January 26, 2002
 24 injured in Tel Aviv suicide bomb attack - published on The Times of India on January 25, 2002
 Warplanes avenge Tel Aviv suicide bombing - published on The Guardian on January 25, 2002
 Tel Aviv Suicide Bomber Injures 25 - published on the Pittsburgh Post-Gazette on January 26, 2002
 Suicide bomber injure 25 in Tel Aviv mall  - published on the Boston Globe on January 26, 2002
 Hamas bomber kills himself, injures 24 on a Tel Aviv mall - published on the Reading Eagle on January 25, 2002
 Suicide bomber attack wounds 24 - published on The Vindicator on January 25, 2002

Suicide bombing in the Israeli–Palestinian conflict
Terrorist attacks attributed to Palestinian militant groups
Terrorist incidents in Israel in 2002
2002 Tel Aviv outdoor mall bombing
2000s crimes in Tel Aviv
January 2002 crimes
January 2002 events in Asia
Building bombings in Israel
Shopping mall bombings
Islamic terrorism in Israel